Huang Ai (born 1919 – September 28, 2008) better known by his pen name Huang Yushi, was a Chinese translator. He is among the first few in China who translated the works of Charles Dickens's into Chinese language.

Biography
Huang was born in Zhongxiang, Hubei in 1919.

He graduated from Tsinghua University in 1950, where he majored in English language.
After graduation, Huang worked in the People's Literature Publishing House, he translated Selected Works of Mao Zedong from Chinese to English in 1950s.

Translations
 Selected Works of Mao Zedong
 Oliver Twist (Charles Dickens)
 The Shipwreck (Rabindranath Tagore)
 The Way of All Flesh (Samuel Butler)
 Rainbow (D. H. Lawrence)
 (Joseph Conrad) Joseph Conrad
 A Portrait of the Artist as a Young Man (James Joyce)

Awards
 Chinese Translation Association - Senior Translator (2004)

Personal life
Huang has a son, Huang Yisi, who also a translator.

References

1919 births
People from Jingmen
Tsinghua University alumni
People's Republic of China translators
English–Chinese translators
Chinese–English translators
2008 deaths
20th-century Chinese translators
21st-century Chinese translators